Robert Alison Lower (April 11, 1844 – January 31, 1918) was a private in the Union Army and a Medal of Honor recipient for his actions in the American Civil War.

Lower joined the 55th Illinois Infantry in October 1861, and was mustered out in October 1864.

Medal of Honor citation
Rank and organization. Private, Company K, 55th Illinois Infantry. Place and date: At Vicksburg, Miss., May 22, 1863. Entered service at: Elmwood, Ill. Birth: Illinois. Date of issue: September 2, 1893.

Citation:

Gallantry in the charge of the "volunteer storming party."

See also

List of Medal of Honor recipients
List of American Civil War Medal of Honor recipients: G–L

References

External links

1844 births
1918 deaths
United States Army Medal of Honor recipients
Union Army soldiers
People from Mattoon, Illinois
People of Illinois in the American Civil War
American Civil War recipients of the Medal of Honor
People from Knox County, Illinois